Nations at the Olympics may refer to:

List of participating nations at the Summer Olympic Games
List of participating nations at the Winter Olympic Games